Pasir Puteh Bypass, Federal Route 210,  is a federal road bypass in Pasir Puteh town, Kelantan, Malaysia.

Features
At most sections, the Federal Route 210 was built under the JKR R5 road standard, with a speed limit of 90 km/h.

List of junctions and towns (northwest-southeast)

References

Malaysian Federal Roads
Highways in Malaysia